Deleted in azoospermia 1, also known as DAZ1, is a protein which in humans is encoded by the DAZ1 gene.

Function 

This gene is a member of the DAZ gene family and is a candidate for the human Y-chromosomal azoospermia factor (AZF). Its expression is restricted to pre-meiotic germ cells, particularly in spermatogonia. It encodes an RNA-binding protein that is important for spermatogenesis. Four copies of this gene are found on chromosome Y within palindromic duplications; one pair of genes is part of the P2 palindrome and the second pair is part of the P1 palindrome. Each gene contains a 2.4 kb repeat including a 72-bp exon, called the DAZ repeat; the number of DAZ repeats is variable and there are several variations in the sequence of the DAZ repeat. Each copy of the gene also contains a 10.8 kb region that may be amplified; this region includes five exons that encode an RNA recognition motif (RRM) domain. This gene contains three copies of the 10.8 kb repeat. However, no transcripts containing three copies of the RRM domain have been described; thus the RefSeq for this gene contains only two RRM domains.

Interactions 

DAZ1 has been shown to interact with DAZAP2, DAZL and DAZ associated protein 1.

References

Further reading